The Zand dynasty was an Iranian dynasty, founded by Karim Khan Zand (1751–1779) that initially ruled southern and central Iran in the 18th century. It later quickly came to expand to include much of the rest of contemporary Iran (except for the provinces of Balochistan and Khorasan) as well as  parts of Iraq. The lands of present-day Armenia, Azerbaijan, and Georgia were controlled by khanates which were de jure part of the Zand realm, but the region was de facto autonomous. The island of Bahrain was also held for the Zands by the autonomous Al-Mazkur sheikhdom of Bushire.

The reign of its most important ruler, Karim Khan, was marked by prosperity and peace. With its capital at Shiraz, arts and architecture flourished under Karim Khan's reign, with some themes in architecture being revived from the nearby sites of the Achaemenid (550–330 BC) and Sasanian (224–651 AD) era's of pre-Islamic Iran. The tombs of the medieval Persian poets Hafez and Saadi Shirazi were also renovated by Karim Khan. Distinctive Zand art which was produced at the behest of the Zand rulers became the foundation of later Qajar arts and crafts. Following the death of Karim Khan, Zand Iran went into decline due to internal disputes amongst members of the Zand dynasty. Its final ruler, Lotf Ali Khan Zand (1789–1794), was eventually executed by Agha Mohammad Khan Qajar (1789–1797) in 1794.

As noted by The Oxford Dictionary of Islam, "Karim Khan Zand holds an enduring reputation as the most humane Iranian ruler of the Islamic era". When following the Islamic Revolution of 1979 the names of the past rulers of Iran became a taboo, the citizens of Shiraz refused to rename the Karim Khan Zand and Lotf Ali Khan Zand streets, the two main streets of Shiraz.

History

Karim Khan Zand

The dynasty was founded by Karim Khan Zand, chief of the Zand tribe, which is a tribe of Laks, a branch of Lurs who may have been originally Kurdish. Nader Shah moved the Zand tribe from their home in the Zagros mountains to the eastern steppes of Khorasan. After Nader's death, the Zand tribe, under the guidance of Karim Khan, went back to their original land. After Adil Shah was made king Karim Khan and his soldiers defected from the army and along with Ali Morad Khan Bakhtiari and Abolfath Khan Haft Lang, two other local chiefs, became a major contender but was challenged by several adversaries. Abolfath Khan was the Vizier, Karim Khan became the army chief commander and Ali Morad Khan became the regent.

Karim Khan declared Shiraz his capital, and in 1778 Tehran became the second capital. He gained control of central and southern parts of Iran. In order to add legitimacy to his claim, Karim Khan placed the infant Shah Ismail III, the grandson of the last Safavid king, on the throne in 1757. Ismail was a figurehead king and real power was vested in Karim Khan. Karim Khan chose to be the military commander and Alimardan Khan was the civil administrator. Soon enough Karim Khan managed to eliminate his partner as well as the puppet king and in 1760, founded his own dynasty. He refused to accept the title of the king and instead named himself Vakilol Ro'aya (Advocate of the People).

By 1760, Karim Khan had defeated all his rivals and controlled all of Iran except Khorasan, in the northeast, which was ruled by Shah Rukh. His foreign campaigns against Azad Khan in Azerbaijan and against the Ottomans in Mesopotamia brought Azerbaijan and the province of Basra into his control. But he never stopped his campaigns against his arch-enemy, Mohammad Hassan Khan Qajar, the chief of the Qoyunlu Qajars. The latter was finally defeated by Karim Khan and his sons, Agha Mohammad Khan and Hossein Qoli Khan Qajar, were brought to Shiraz as hostages.

Karim Khan's monuments in Shiraz include the famous Arg of Karim Khan, Vakil Bazaar, and several mosques and gardens. He is also responsible for building of a palace in the town of Tehran, the future capital of the Qajar dynasty.

Decline and fall

Karim Khan's death in 1779 left his territory vulnerable to threats from his enemies. His son and successor Abu al-Fath was an incompetent ruler who was heavily influenced by his half uncle (and Karim Khan's commander), Zaki Khan. Other rulers such as Ali Morad and Jafar Khan also failed to follow the policies of Karim Khan and soon enough, the country was under attack from all sides.

The biggest enemies of the Zands, the Qajar chiefs, led by the former hostage, Agha Mohammad Khan, were advancing fast against the declining kingdom. Finally, in 1789, Lotf Ali Khan, a grand-nephew of Karim Khan, declared himself the new king. His reign (until 1794) was spent mostly in war with the Qajar khan. He was finally captured and brutally killed in the fortress of Bam, putting an effective end to the Zand Dynasty.

Politically, it is also important that the Zands, especially Karim Khan, chose to call themselves Vakilol Ro'aya (Advocate of the People) instead of kings. Other than the obvious propaganda value of the title, it can be a reflection of the popular demands of the time, expecting rulers with popular leanings instead of absolute monarchs who were totally detached from the population, like the earlier Safavids.

Foreign policy
In foreign policy, Karim Khan attempted to revive the Safavid era trade by allowing the British to establish a trading post in the port of Bushehr. This opened the hands of the British East India company in Iran and increased their influence in the country. The taxation system was reorganized in a way that taxes were levied fairly. The judicial system was fair and generally humane. Capital punishment was rarely implemented.

Art

The Zand era was an era of relative peace and economic growth for the country. Many territories that were once captured by the Ottomans in the late Safavid era were retaken, and Iran was once again a coherent and prosperous country. From 1765 onwards Karim Khan promoted art and architecture at his capital Shiraz. After Iranian painting reached its height at the end of the 17th century, a special school of painting took shape during the Zand era in the 17th and 18th centuries. Painting thrived under Karim Khan, and notable paintings from this era include Muhammad Karim Khan Zand and the Ottoman Ambassador which was created . The most important painter of the Zand era was Mohammad Sadiq. The art of this era is remarkable and, despite the short length of the dynasty, a distinct Zand art had the time to emerge. Many Qajar artistic traits were copied from the Zand examples and Zand art became the foundation of Qajar arts and crafts. Following Karim Khan's death, the Zand dynasty became embroiled in disputes over succession and other intrigues, which put a halt to further significant patronage of the arts.

Architecture
Karim Khan's first architectural considerations were focussed on defense and he therefore rebuilt the city walls of Shiraz in 1767. He decorated Shiraz with new buildings including the Arg of Karim Khan, the Vakil Bazaar and the Kulah-e Farangi and grouped these around a public square (maidan in Persian). Zand-era architecture is notable in Iranian history for "its revetments in carved marble and overglaze-painted tiles with flowers, animals and people". The Grove Encyclopedia of Islamic Art and Architecture notes that some themes employed by Zand architecture were knowingly revived from the nearby ancient Achaemenid and Sasanian sites, such as Persepolis and Naqsh-e Rostam.

Religion
Karim Khan, similar to many tribal leaders, was rather moderate in his religious commitments, although he supported Shia traditions and minted coins in the name of Hujjat Allah al-Mahdi, the Mahdi of Twelver Shia's. The Ta'ziyeh passion plays, in honor of Husayn ibn Ali, also evolved during the Zand period.

Legacy

As noted by The Oxford Dictionary of Islam, "Karim Khan Zand holds an enduring reputation as the most humane Iranian ruler of the Islamic era". Karim Khan is the subject of many stories about his "kindness, generosity and justice". The Oxford Encyclopedia of the Islamic World  adds that he is described as "a model ruler who never took the title of Shah". The Zand entity of Karim Khan was at peace and the roads within the realm were reportedly free of bandits. Karim Khan rebuilt Shiraz, his capital, and decorated it with new buildings including the Arg of Karim Khan, the Vakil Bazaar and the Kulah-e Farangi. He also restored the tombs of the medieval Persian poets Hafez and Saadi Shirazi. Until this day, the inhabitants of Shiraz honor Karim Khan. When following the Islamic Revolution of 1979 the names of the past rulers of Iran became a taboo, the citizens of Shiraz refused to rename the Karim Khan Zand Street and Lotf-Ali Khan Zand Street, the two main streets of Shiraz.

Rulers/kings
Karim Khan Zand, 1751–1779 
Mohammad Ali Khan Zand, 1779 
Abol-Fath Khan Zand, 1779 
Sadeq Khan Zand, 1779–1782 
Ali-Morad Khan Zand, 1782–1785 
 Jafar Khan, 1785–1789 
 Sayed Morad Khan, 1789 
Lotf Ali Khan, 1789–1794

Other notable members
Zaki Khan Zand
Rustam Khan Zand

Family tree

See also
List of monarchs of Persia
List of Shia dynasties

References

 
18th century in Iran
Empires and kingdoms of Iran
Iranian Muslim dynasties
Middle Eastern dynasties
Shia dynasties
Former monarchies of Western Asia
18th century in Azerbaijan
18th century in Armenia
18th century in Georgia (country)
Ottoman Iraq
States and territories established in 1751
States and territories disestablished in 1794
1751 establishments in Iran
1790s disestablishments in Iran
1751 establishments in Asia
1794 disestablishments in Asia
Former countries